Devlet I Giray (1512–1577, r. 1551–1577, ; , ‎)  was a Crimean Khan. His long and eventful reign saw many highly significant historical events: the fall of Kazan to Russia in 1552, the fall of the Astrakhan Khanate to Russia in 1556, the burning of Moscow at the hands of the Crimean Tatars in 1571 and the defeat of the Crimeans near Moscow in 1572. During Devlet's reign there were a number of Cossack raids on Crimea.

Early life and enthronement
Devlet was the son of Mubarak, and grandson of Meñli I Giray (1478–1515). From Mengli's death until Devlet's accession the throne was held by Mubarak's brothers and their sons, so Devlet was from a collateral branch. Mubarak served Sultan Selim I the Grim and died fighting in Egypt in 1516–17. In 1530 Devlet became Kalga to his uncle Saadet I Giray (1524–1532). When Saadet abdicated in 1532 he was imprisoned and then followed his uncle to Istanbul. Girays in the Turkish service were potential Crimean khans. In 1551 Sahib I Giray refused a Turkish order to fight in Persia. Devlet was sent to replace him. The Crimean army went over to Devlet, Sahib was captured and killed and by Devlet's order Sahib's children and grandchildren were also killed.

Reign

Losing Kazan
Anti-Russian and pro-independent rulers of Kazan were from the Crimean Giray dynasty (these are: Sahib I Giray, Safa Giray of Kazan and Ötemish Giray). In 1551 they were replaced by the pro-Russian Shahgoli with the support of Russia, but soon the Kazanians replaced Shahgoli. Learning that the pro-Russian Shahghali had been driven out of Kazan, in March 1552 Ivan decided on a major campaign against that Khanate. Learning of this, Devlet decided to attack Muscovy while the army was away, which would give him an easy victory and also protect Kazan. Nearing Ryazan he learned that Ivan was waiting for him at Kolomna. He planned to retreat, but his men did not want to go home without loot. He besieged Tula on 21 June, but two days an advancing Russian army and a sortie by the garrison drove the Tatars away and captured the wagons and all the Turkish artillery. In October of that year Russia conquered the Khanate of Kazan.

Losing Astrakhan
After the fall of Kazan Yamghurchi of Astrakhan broke with Russia and allied with Crimea. Devlet sent 13 cannon but no soldiers. In the spring of 1554 Ivan sent 33,000 soldiers down the Volga, drove out Yamgurchi and replaced him with Dervish Ali Astrakhani. Dervish then broke with Russia and allied with Crimea. Devlet sent some cannon, advisors, 300 Janissaries and 700 Crimeans. In 1556 Russia drove out Dervish and conquered Astrakhan.

Meanwhile, on the steppe Ismail was in conflict with his elder brother Yusuf Bey, the father of the unfortunate Söyembikä of Kazan. He sought support from the Turks. The Sultan turned the matter over to the Crimeans who were in charge of steppe affairs. Devlet said no and Ismail turned to Moscow. He proposed a joint attack on Astrakhan to put his protégé Dervish Ali on the throne. Ismail's horsemen were to meet Russian boats on the Volga, but he did not show up because he was away fighting his brother Yusuf. The Russians took Astrakhan without him. Ismail killed Yusuf and became head of the Nogais. Kazi-Mirza gathered those who disliked the rule of a pro-Russian fratricide and led them to the Kuban where they formed the Small Nogai Horde which was closely allied with Crimea.

Further wars against Russia
Around this time Russia was briefly involved in the North Caucasus. See Kabardia. In the spring of 1555 Devlet led an army to the North Caucasus to deal with some Circassians who had gone over to the Russians. Learning of this, Ivan sent 13000 men under Sheremetev and Saltykov south in the direction of Perekop. On the way they learned that Devlet had turned north intending to attack Ryazan. Ivan reinforced the Oka bank Line, Devlet retreated and bumped into Sheremetev near Sudbishchi 150 km south of Tula. Sheremetev captured his supply wagons, Devlet attacked and suffered great losses, including his sons Kalga Akhmed Geray and Haji Geray. Another son, Mehmed, rushed north, defeated Sheremetev and the Crimeans returned home.

In the spring of 1556 Devlet failed a third time in a raid on Muscovy. In January 1558 Devlet sent 100,000 men under his eldest son Kalga Mehmed Geray to attack Tula, Ryazan and Kashira. Learning of a Russian concentration on the Oka, they turned back. The Russians chased them as far as the river Oskol but could not catch them. In May–June 1562 Devlet sent 15000 men to raid around Mtsensk, Odoev, Novosil, Bolkhov Cherny and Belyov. In the spring 1563 Devlet's sons Mehmed and Adil raided around Dedilov, Pronsk and Ryazan. In October 1564 Develt and his two sons raided around Ryazan for six days. In autumn 1565 Devlet and a small army raided around Bolkhov but was driven off. After the 1569 Astrakhan campaign (below), in spring 1570 his sons Mehmed and Adil Geray devastated the area around Ryazan and Kashira.

At some point, given his failures, Devlet tried to make peace with Moscow, but his nobles refused.

Against Cossacks
About this time Dmytro Vyshnevetsky was turning the Zaporozhian Cossacks into a serious fighting force. In 1556 Devlet led his army toward the Circassia, but turned back when he learned that pro-Russian Cossacks were descending the Dnieper and Don. The Cossacks wrecked Islyam-Kerman/Kakhovka, and carried its cannon back to Khortytsia. They attacked Ak-Chum/Ochakov and Kerch, but on the approach of Devlet's army they slipped away.

In the spring of 1557 Devlet besieged Vishnevetsky and the Zaporozhian Cossacks Khortytsia. After 24 days he was forced to retreat.

In 1558 Vishnevetsky, Zaporozhian Cossacks and 5000 Russian soldiers went on ships to the lower Don, raided deep into Crimean territories, besieged Azak/Azov and defeated a Crimean force. At the same time 8000 Russians under Adashev went down the Dnieper and raided the west coast of Crimea, looted villages and freed many captives from Russia and Lithuania. The Turks they captured were freed since they were not at war with the sultan.

Circassians invaded Crimea across the Kerch strait, but Devlet defeated them and seized their leaders. Around this time Ismail tried several times to break through Perekop. Many of the mainland Nogais fled to Crimea or joined Ismail. There was also drought with hunger and plague.
Pressure was relieved when Vishnevetsky broke with Ivan and Ivan turned to the Livonian War (1558–1563).

Ottoman Turks fail to take Astrakhan
As early as 1563 the Turks developed a grandiose plan to recapture Astrakhan from the infidels, reopen the trade and pilgrim route north of the Caspian and dig a canal from the Don to the Volga to send ships from the Black to the Caspian Sea and attack Persia from the Caspian. Devlet was not happy with the idea of being surrounded by Turkish territory and did what he could to dissuade the sultan. There are suggestions that he interfered with the campaign even while he was on it.

On 31 May 1569 Kasim-Pasha set out for Astrakhan with 15000 Janissaries, several thousand other Turks, and 30000 laborers to dig the canal. He was joined by 40 or 50 thousand of Devlet's men. They went up the Don to the point where the rivers are closest and started digging. It quickly became obvious that the canal was impossible and there was no way to haul the boats and artillery across the steppe. The artillery was sent back downriver. Kasim planned to leave but heard that he could get ships on the Volga, so he crossed the steppe and went down to Astrakhan. The town was easy, but there was no way to take the fort without cannon. There was talk of waiting for re-supply in the spring, but they had only 40 days of supply and the soldiers became mutinous at the thought of spending the winter in tents on the steppe. On 26 September Kasim lifted the siege and headed west. They were harassed by Circassians and a Russian army sent south. The mounted Crimeans and Nogais did fairly well but the soldiers suffered greatly on the waterless steppe. Much of the fleet was wrecked by a storm at Azov. See Russo-Turkish War (1568–1570).

Fire of Moscow

Given his previous failures along the Oka, in the spring of 1571 Devlet led 40000 men north to attack Kozelsk and Bolkhov south of the western Oka Bank Line. Approaching Muscovy he met six boyars who had fled Ivan the Terrible's increasing madness. They promised to show the Tatars an unguarded area along the Oka. They said that most of the Russian army was away in Livonia and the country was weakened by crop failure and plague. When Devlet crossed the Oka Ivan fled to Rostov. By 24 May Devlet was near Moscow directing raiding parties. Moscow caught fire, a strong wind blew up and within a few hours the wooden city was in ashes except for the Kremlin walls. People who fled the fire were captured. Devlet returned to Crimea, taking more captives along the way. It is said that tens of thousands of Russians were killed and 150 thousand enslaved. See Fire of Moscow (1571).

Battle of Molodi

There was talk of taking diplomatic advantage of the unexpected victory, but Devlet decided on a knock-out blow. By 5 August he had 120 thousand men on the Oka – 80 thousand Crimeans and Nogais, 33 thousand Turks and 7000 janissaries. A Nogai detachment crossed the river and the rest of the army followed. Ivan fled towards Novgorod. The troops on the Oka went after Devlet, blocking his retreat. Devlet told his men to ignore them and concentrate on catching Ivan. His sons Mehmed and Adil disobeyed, attacked the Russians and were defeated. Devlet sent 10000 Nogai against the Russians but they fell under artillery fire. Devlet broke off the pursuit and turned his large army to block the advancing Russians. The Russians broke into groups and surrounded each group with gulyay-gorods. The first battle was about even, but the Russians captured Deve-Bey, the leader of the Nogais. Baki-Bey? Devlet planned to surround the gulay-gorods and starve them out, but the leaderless Nogais demanded immediate action. Devlet had to agree. The decisive battle took place on 11 August. When the cavalry attacked the gulay-gorods their walls were dropped revealing artillery and musketeers. The Tatars fell back and were caught by a Russian troop that had slipped behind them. The losses were worse than the previous day and Devlet lost a son and grandson. While this was going on the Tatars captured a message from Ivan saying that he was arriving with a large force. The message was a trick, Devlet fell for it and retreated, having lost a large part of his army. Estimates of the survivors range from 5 to 20 thousand. See Battle of Molodi.

Death
In subsequent years there were small raids on Muscovy by his sons and various Crimean and Nogai mirzas. As he grew older there were difficult relations between his sons Mehmed and Adil. He died of plague on 29 June 1577 and was buried at Bakhchisarai. He was followed by his oldest son Mehmed II Geray (1577–1584).

Family

Devlet's wives were: Aisha Fatima Khatun, a Circassian princess; Khansuret Khatun, daughter of Circassian Prince Kambulat Cherkasski; Khanbike Khatun; Farkhan Khatun; Jamali Khatun. One of his wives were Ayse Sultan, who are one of only three women known to have played a political role in the Crimean Khanate.

Devlet had many sons, including Mehmed II Giray (1577–1584), İslâm II Giray (1584–1588), Ğazı II Giray (1588–1607), Fetih I Giray (1596–1597), Selâmet I Giray (1608–1610), Mehmed III Giray (1610, 1623–1627), Mubarak, Adil, Alp, Sahin, Akhmed and Haji (both killed by the Russians in 1555). Saadet II Giray (1584) was a son of Mehmed II. Canibek Giray (1610–1623, 1624, 1627–1635) was a son of Mubarak.

Devlet was the ancestor of all subsequent khans. For his ancestors see Meñli I Giray. He had 12 or more sons:
Khaspudan: little information
Akhmed and Haji: both killed by Russians at Sudbishchi in 1555
Sherdan possibly killed at the Battle of Molodi in 1572
Khan Mehmed II Giray 1577–1584. fought in Persia for Turks, deposed by Turks, killed by brother Alp
Khan Islyam II Giray 1584–1588, imposed by Turks, unsuccessful, natural death
Khan Gazi II Giray 1588–1607, fought for Turks in west, 2 sons were khans
Khan Fetih I Giray 1596, briefly imposed by Turks, grandson a Khan
Khan Selâmet I Giray 1608–1610, fled to Turkey, made khan by Turks, 3 sons were khans
Shaki Mubarek, fled Gazi II, died in Circassia, son a khan 
Adil: executed by Persians in 1579
Alp: good warrior, quarrelsome, almost became khan in 1583 and 1588
Grandsons:
Mehmed's son Khan Saadet II Giray (1584) rebelled against Islyam II
Gazi II's sons Khan Toqtamış Giray 1607–1608 and Khan Inaet Geray 1635–1637)
Mubarek's son Khan Canibek Giray (1610–1623, 1628–1635)
Fetih's grandson Khan Adil Giray (1666–1671)
All subsequent khans were descended from Selyamet, except for the sons and grandsons of his brothers noted above.

References
Oleksa Gaivoronsky «Повелители двух материков», Kiev-Bakhchisarai, second edition, 2010, volume 1, pages 249–298
Henry Hoyle Howorth, History of the Mongols, 1880, Part 2, pp. 488–512

1512 births
1577 deaths
Crimean Khans
16th-century rulers in Europe
Pretenders